Mangueshi is a village in Priol, Ponda, Goa, India. Mangueshi/Mangueshim are other variations for the same name.

Main Attraction

The temple of Shri Mangesh is set amidst natural surroundings.  Mangeshi, which is a little village along Goa's Panaji-Ponda road is a point of pilgrimage for hundreds of tourists from all over India and abroad.

The temples of Shree Shantadurga located at Kavale village, Navdurga at Madkai, and Shree Mangesh, are three revered patron deities of GSB families in Goa are a must visit for any devotee/ tourist coming to Goa.

History
The original site of Sri Mangueshi Temple is Kushasthali or Cortalim in Salcette Taluka. To avoid the increasing Portuguese missionary activities in Goa, the GSB community was afraid for the safety of the temples and idols. Hence the families worshipping Shree Shantadurga and Shree Manguesh, on a moonless night, leaving their homes and hearths crossed over the Zuari River to a safer region which was under the rule of the Muslim King Adilshah.

After remaining in the house of a temple priest for sometime, the deity idol was finally installed at its present site in the village.

The territory of Ponda was not under Portuguese rule in the 16th Century and hence was seen as a safe haven by the Hindus fleeing persecution by the Jesuits and Portuguese. The forests of Ponda were ideal places for Hindus to form makeshift temples with the Idols they had salvaged from the broken temples of Sashti (Salsette).

Mangeshkar Family
The famous musical family of the Mangeshkar's belong to this village of Mangeshi. Their father, Deenanath Mangeshkar was born (1900) in the village of Mangueshi then in Portuguese India to a temple priest and handmaiden of the deity Manguesh. His mother tongue was Konkani. His father was a married Karhade Brahmin pujari and his mother was his Devadasi mistress belonging to Gomantak Maratha Samaj community of Goa.

Deenanath's father had the last name Hardikar;, but Deenanath did not inherit his father's Brahmin caste and surname because his parents were not married to each other. Deenanath adopted the surname Mangeshkar in order to identify his family with his native town - Mangueshi.

Reaching Mangueshi Village

By Air
Mangueshi is 37.92 km from Dabolim Airport.
Goa Dabolim Airport is well connected from all major cities of India & abroad.

By train
 The nearest town of Ponda is located at a distance of 17 km from Karmali railway station.
 The major railway terminus of Madgaon has bus services catering up to Ponda.

By Road
 Local bus services operated by private bus owners ply regularly from Ponda Bus Stand as well as from Kadamba Bus Stand, Panjim.

See also
 Mangueshi Temple
 Kavale
 Shanta Durga temple

References

Villages in North Goa district